The Big John Farm Limestone Bank Barn, located north of U.S. Route 56 and east of Big John Creek in Council Grove, Morris County, Kansas, was listed on the National Register of Historic Places in 1990.

It is a bank barn, which is a barn built against a hillside having entrances on two levels.

Built during 1871-1872, the limestone barn measures . The roof is of a double truss design of native oak. The property, at one time, was owned by Seth Hays and it is likely he paid for its construction.

The farm was purchased by Morris County in 1877 for use as a poor farm, and it served as that until 1945.

At the time of the National Register listing in 1990, study was underway about how the barn could be restored and reused in some way; a grant had been received to hire an architect or engineer to address structural problems.

During 1992 to 2006, the barn's roof, windows, and drain pipes were replaced and its walls were repaired.

It is located behind (on the north side of) what is now the Morris County Fairgrounds. A sign on westbound Highway 56 indicates "OLD STONE BARN" at what is also an entrance to the Morris County Recycling Center and the Morris County Transfer Station. Big John Creek runs through the property.

References

External links

Flickr photo 1, 2, 3, and 4

National Register of Historic Places in Morris County, Kansas
Buildings and structures completed in 1871
Barns on the National Register of Historic Places in Kansas
Bank barns